Coleophora beduina is a moth of the family Coleophoridae. It is found in Algeria, Tunisia and Libya.

The larvae feed on Hammada schwienfurthi. They feed on the shoots and possibly also on the fruits of their host plant.

References

beduina
Moths described in 1987
Moths of Africa